Daniel Flores (July 11, 1929 – September 19, 2006), also known by his stage name Chuck Rio, was an American rock and roll saxophonist. He is best remembered for his self-penned song "Tequila", which he recorded with The Champs, and which reached number one on the Billboard Hot 100.

Biography 
Flores was born in Santa Paula, California and grew up in Long Beach. He was interested in the guitar from an early age, first performing at church and family gatherings. At 14, however, Flores switched to the saxophone, forming his first band, the 3-D Ranch Boys. Emulating the rasping sounds of tenor saxophonist Vido Musso, Flores played a variety of music genres - jazz, country, pop, and blues - to cater to his hard-going blue-collar clientele. Much to Flores's amusement, he has remarked, during this early stage of his career, he was commonly called the "Mexican Hillbilly". In the early 1950s, Flores recorded vocals for small Pasadena-based record labels, before signing to Modern Records/RPM Records, and releasing his earliest rock and roll material.

In 1957
, Flores met aspiring songwriter and guitarist Dave Burgess. After briefly performing as Danny and Dave, the duo recruited former members of Flores's group, drummer Gene Alden and guitarist Buddy Bruce, along with bassist Cliff Hills to form the Champs. Huelyn Duvall contributed vocals to these tracks. On December 23, 1957, the group recorded three songs for Challenge Records, including Flores' instrumental Tequila. The song is highlighted by Flores's "dirty sax" arrangements and hollering of "Tequila". However, because of this one spoken phrase by Flores, he was credited as Chuck Rio to avoid conflicts with his other record label, where he was signed as a vocalist. "Tequila" was released as the B-side to the Champs' debut single, but after listeners requested the song over its A-side "Train to Nowhere", "Tequila" propelled to number one on the Billboard Hot 100 in January 1958.

Conflicts between Flores and Burgess over leadership and the band's musical direction led to Flores' departure. He signed his rights away to Tequila, and ultimately did not receive any royalties from the tune, despite its success. In the intervening years, he formed other groups called the Originals, and the Persuaders (the latter recording for Saturn Records in 1963). Flores continued to perform across California for the rest of his life. It was not until the early 2000s that he finally received royalties — albeit only for sales in Europe — for Tequila.

Flores died on September 19, 2006 as a consequence of complications of pneumonia.

References

External links

1929 births
2006 deaths
Chicano rock musicians
American male singer-songwriters
American rock singers
American rock songwriters
American musicians of Mexican descent
American male saxophonists
Burials in Orange County, California
Deaths from pneumonia in California
Hispanic and Latino American musicians
Musicians from Greater Los Angeles
People from Santa Paula, California
Rock en Español musicians
RPM Records (United States) artists
Kent Records artists
Challenge Records artists
Apex Records artists
20th-century American singers
20th-century American saxophonists
Singer-songwriters from California
20th-century American male singers